Dalnair Castle, also known as Dalnair House, is a Scottish baronial castle dating from around 1884. It is located outside the village of Croftamie in Stirling, Scotland, on the edge of Loch Lomond and The Trossachs National Park.

History

1884–1940s 
Dalnair Castle was built for a Glaswegian merchant named Thomas Brown around 1884 on the site of the former much smaller "Endrickbank House".

The property survived a major fire that engulfed it in 1917. At the time of the fire the building belonged to Henry Christie, a calico printer, who owned it until the 1940s.

1940s–2000s 
The castle then passed into the hands of the Glasgow Western Hospital Board and it was used as a nurses' home until Killearn Hospital closed in 1972 For much of the 1970s it was a training and conference centre for British Steel. On 2000, it became a nursing home before becoming vacant and at risk of becoming a ruin.

2016–present 
In 2016 the FM Group, a Scottish property developer, bought the property and is refurbishing the baronial castle into luxury apartments. The plans also include construction work in the estate surrounding the castle, where a number of family homes have and continue to be built.

See also 
List of castles in Stirling
List of listed buildings in Drymen, Stirling

References

Scottish baronial architecture
Castles in Stirling (council area)
Buildings and structures completed in 1884
1884 establishments in Scotland